In mathematics, the term infinitesimal generator may refer to:

 an element of the Lie algebra, associated to a Lie group
 Infinitesimal generator (stochastic processes), of a stochastic process
 infinitesimal generator matrix, of a continuous time Markov chain, a class of stochastic processes
 Infinitesimal generator of a strongly continuous semigroup